Katarina Juselius (born 25 September 1943) is professor Emeritus of econometrics and empirical economics at the University of Copenhagen. Her work has been on empirical macro models and associated issues. 

She obtained her Lic.Econ.Sc. and PhD from the Swedish School of Economics and Business Administration in Helsinki.

Research 
She is the 271st most quoted economist in the world according to IDEAS and her research has been quoted 27000 times. She is also the on the editorial board of Journal of Economic Methodology. Her most quoted paper, "Maximum likelihood estimation and inference on cointegration—with applications to the demand for money" has been quoted over 16000 times.

Personal life 
She is married to Søren Johansen who is also a professor of econometrics at the same university.

Selected publications

References

External links
  Katarina Juselius's home page at University of Copenhagen

Academic staff of the University of Copenhagen
21st-century Swedish economists
Swedish women economists
Econometricians
Women statisticians
1943 births
Living people
Danish women academics
Swedish statisticians